Jean-Philippe Bergeron (born 1978 Saint-Hyacinthe) is a Canadian French-language writer and poet. He won the Prix Alain-Grandbois in 2004.

Publications
 Bergeron, Jean-Philippe. Visages de l'affolement: poèmes. Outremont, Québec : Lanctôt, 2003.  : Montréal : Poètes de brousse, 2016. 
 Bergeron, Jean-Philippe. Débris des ruches. Montréal : Poètes de brousse, 2005. 
 Bergeron, Jean-Philippe. Ombres. Montréal : Poètes de brousse, 2007. 
 Bergeron, Jean-Philippe. Géométrie fantôme (with Jean-Sébastien Denis). Montréal : Poètes de brousse, 2011. 
 Bergeron, Jean-Philippe. Les Planches anatomiques. Montréal : Poètes de Brousse, 2014,

References

External links
"Poésie en musique au Café chaos"

21st-century Canadian poets
Writers from Quebec
Prix Alain-Grandbois
Canadian poets in French
Living people
1978 births
Canadian male poets
21st-century Canadian male writers